3,3′-Diindolylmethane (DIM) is a compound derived from the digestion of indole-3-carbinol, found in cruciferous vegetables, such as broccoli, Brussels sprouts, cabbage and kale. It and its parent compound  indole-3-carbinol  are under laboratory research to determine their possible biological properties, particularly in anti-cancer mechanisms. DIM is sold as a dietary supplement.

Properties
In vitro, DIM has action as a histone deacetylase inhibitor, specifically against HDAC1, HDAC2, and HDAC3. DIM is a metabolite of indole-3-carbinol. DIM was found to be a mild cannabinoid agonist with low binding affinity for both CB1 and CB2.

See also
 Glucobrassicin, precursor to indole-3-carbinol
 Phytochemicals

References

External links 
 Diindolylmethane Information Resource Center, University of California-Berkeley

Indoles
Antineoplastic drugs
Histone deacetylase inhibitors